The  is a Dutch and German breed of dairy cattle. It is reported from the Netherlands and Belgium, but may be extinct in Germany.

History 

It is however supported by molecular genetic studies, which have shown that the Gurtenvieh, the Lakenvelder and the Belted Galloway all carry the same candidate gene for the belted phenotype. Cattle with this characteristic are shown in Dutch paintings from the seventeenth century. It seems likely that the Lakenvelder derives directly from Swiss and Austrian belted cattle, and that during the reign of William of Orange some cattle of this type found their way to Scotland, where they inter-bred with Galloway stock, giving rise to the Belted Galloway.

A herd-book for the Lakenvelder was started in 1918; at that time there were about fifteen farms breeding the cattle, with some 200 head between them. In 1930 regulations were introduced to control milk production and to make testing for tuberculosis obligatory; by the end of the Second World War only five herds remained.

Characteristics

Use

References 

Cattle breeds
Cattle breeds originating in the Netherlands
Conservation Priority Breeds of the Livestock Conservancy
Dairy cattle breeds
Cattle breeds originating in Germany